The 1939 College Football All Polish-American Team was the first all-star College Football Team of Polish-Americans. The team was selected by five American sport scribes from leading American newspapers. All members were of Polish descent.

First team

References

All-America Team
College Football All-America Teams
American people of Polish descent